Dystrophaeus is the name given to an extinct genus of eusauropod dinosaur from the early Kimmeridgian stage of the Late Jurassic that existed around 154.8 Ma. Its fossils were found in the Tidwell Member of the Morrison Formation of Utah.

Description 
Not much can be surmised due to the fragmentary nature and uncertain phylogenetic position of Dystrophaeus. Edward Cope noted in his 1877 description that the humerus was exceptionally long, a characteristic seen in many sauropods, and was then the longest known humerus of any dinosaur. The scapula preserves the sole published autapomorphy for Dystrophaeus; a subtriangular projection on the end of the scapular blade, though this trait is also shared in some basal sauropods.

History

Discovery and naming 

Few dinosaur fossils had been collected in the American West until the 1850s, with expeditions by naturalists like Joseph Leidy and Ferdinand Vandeveer Hayden in South Dakota and Montana finding fragmentary fossils, mostly teeth, from dinosaurs in 1855 and 1856. The next discovery came accidentally in 1859 when while Captain John N. Macomb was leading a U.S. Army Engineers survey from Santa Fe to the confluence of the Green and Colorado Rivers, his crew camped south of what is now Moab, Utah. In August, a geologist from the crew named John Strong Newberry, unearthed several large fossil bones in sandstone rocks elevated in a canyon wall near the camp. Newberry successfully excavated several of the bones with several other crew members while using poor equipment, but several fossils remained in the sandstone rocks due to the team's time constraints of the expedition. The specimen was from the Late Jurassic Morrison Formation, and was notably from the older Tidwell Member of the Oxfordian, and is one of the few dinosaurs known from the member. The fossils were turned over to Joseph Leidy in Philadelphia, and later to Edward Drinker Cope, who described them in the Proceedings of the American Philosophical Society in 1877. Cope named the remains Dystrophaeus viaemalae, the genus name means "coarse joint" from Greek dys, "bad", and stropheus, "joint", a reference to the pitted joint surfaces serving as an attachment for cartilage. The specific name reads as Latin viae malae, "of the bad road", a reference to the various arduous routes taken to find, reach and salvage the remains.

Rediscovery 
Dystrophaeus received little attention besides its classification until the 1970s until amateur Moab geologist Fran Barnes attempted to rediscover Newberry's original Dystrophaeus locality, eventually rediscovering the site in 1987. The rediscovery was confirmed by David Gillette and in 2014 John Foster created the Dystrophaeus Project, which launched another expedition to the site the same year to recover additional material left behind by the Macomb Expedition. Another expedition was launched in 2017, the two recent expeditions recovering various elements including teeth, vertebrae, and additional limb bones, though many remain unprepared.

Classification 
The classification of Dystrophaeus has been rather confusing. Cope in 1877 merely concluded it was some Triassic dinosaur. Henri-Émile Sauvage in 1882 understood it was a sauropod, assigning it to the Atlantosauridae. Othniel Charles Marsh however, in 1895 stated it belonged to the Stegosauridae. Friedrich von Huene, the first to determine it was of Jurassic age, in 1904 created a special family for it, the Dystrophaeidae, which he assumed to be herbivorous theropods. Only in 1908 von Huene realised his mistake and classified it in the sauropod family Cetiosauridae, refining this in 1927 to the Cardiodontinae. Alfred Romer in 1966 put it in the Brachiosauridae, in a subfamily Cetiosaurinae.

More recently, an analysis by David Gillette concluded it was a member of the Diplodocidae. Another recent review, by Tschopp and colleagues in 2015, suggest it is a member of the Dicraeosauridae. However, many researchers consider the taxon to be a nomen dubium. Newer finds of Dystrophaeus have led paleontologist John Foster and colleagues to suggest it was most closely related to Macronarian or Eusauropod dinosaurs, although much material has yet to be prepared.

References

Dicraeosaurids
Late Jurassic dinosaurs of North America
Fossil taxa described in 1877
Taxa named by Edward Drinker Cope